Events from the year 1633 in Ireland.

Incumbent
Monarch: Charles I

Events
St Columb's Cathedral, Derry is completed; the first post-Reformation Anglican cathedral built in the British Isles and the first Protestant cathedral built in Europe.

Births
William FitzMaurice, 20th Baron Kerry
James Hamilton, 3rd Baron Hamilton of Strabane, peer (d. 1655)

References

 
1630s in Ireland
Ireland
Years of the 17th century in Ireland